Thomas Edward Silverstein (February 4, 1952 – May 11, 2019) was an American criminal who spent the last 42 years of his life in prison after being convicted of four separate murders while imprisoned for armed robbery, one of which was overturned. Silverstein spent the last 36 years of his life in solitary confinement for killing Corrections Officer Merle Clutts at the Marion Penitentiary in Illinois. Prison authorities described him as a brutal killer and a former leader of the Aryan Brotherhood prison gang. Silverstein maintained that the dehumanizing conditions inside the prison system contributed to the three murders he committed. He was held "in a specially designed cell" in what is called "Range 13" at ADX Florence federal penitentiary in Colorado. He was the longest-held prisoner in solitary confinement within the Bureau of Prisons at the time of his death. Many prison guards refused to talk to Silverstein out of respect for Clutts.

Early life 
Silverstein was born in Long Beach, California, to Virginia Conway. Conway had divorced her first husband in 1952 while pregnant with Silverstein and married Thomas Conway, whom Silverstein claimed was his biological father. Four years later, Virginia divorced Conway and married Sid Silverstein, who legally adopted her son.

Silverstein was timid, awkward, shy, and frequently bullied as a child in the middle-class neighborhood where the family lived, in part because his peers mistakenly believed he was Jewish. Virginia Silverstein demanded that her son fight back, telling the boy that if he ever came home again crying because he had been beaten up by a bully, she would be waiting to give him another beating. Silverstein states, "That's how my mom was. She stood her mud. If someone came at you with a bat, you got your bat and you both went at it." At age fourteen, Silverstein was sentenced to a California Youth Authority reformatory where, he said, his attitudes about violence were reinforced. "Anyone not willing to fight was abused."

In 1971, at age nineteen, Silverstein was sent to San Quentin Prison in California for armed robbery. Four years later, he was paroled, but he was arrested soon after along with his father, Thomas Conway, and his cousin, Gerald Hoff, for three armed robberies. Their take was less than $11,000 (~$53,000 when adjusted for inflation in 2022). In 1977, Silverstein was sentenced to fifteen years for armed robbery, to be served at United States Penitentiary in Leavenworth, Kansas.

Murders at USP Marion 
While at Leavenworth, Silverstein developed ties with the Aryan Brotherhood. In 1980, Silverstein was convicted of the murder of inmate Danny Atwell, who reportedly refused to serve as a mule for heroin being moved through the prison. He was sentenced to life and transferred to the United States Penitentiary in Marion, Illinois (USP Marion), which was then a high security facility. The conviction was overturned in 1985 after it emerged that the jailhouse informants who testified at his trial had perjured themselves on the stand.

At Marion, Silverstein was housed in the "Control Unit", a virtual solitary confinement regime reserved for extreme "management problems" (prisoners prone to assaultive and disruptive behavior) in the prison.

In 1981, Silverstein was accused of the murder of Robert Chappelle, a member of the D.C. Blacks prison gang. Silverstein and another inmate, Clayton Fountain, were convicted and Silverstein received an additional life sentence. He avoided a possible death sentence since capital punishment on the federal level hadn't been reinstated yet. Silverstein maintained his innocence. While Silverstein was on trial for Chappelle's murder, the Bureau of Prisons transferred Raymond Lee "Cadillac" Smith, the national leader of the D.C. Blacks prison gang, from another prison into the control unit in Marion. From the moment Smith arrived in the control unit, prison logs show that he began trying to kill Silverstein.

"I tried to tell Cadillac that I didn't kill Chappelle, but he didn't believe me and he bragged that he was going to kill me", Silverstein recalled. "Everyone knew what was going on and no one did anything to keep us apart. The guards wanted one of us to kill the other." Silverstein and Clayton Fountain killed Smith with improvised weapons, stabbing him 67 times. After Smith was dead, they dragged his body up and down the catwalk in front of the cells, displaying it to other prisoners. Silverstein received another life sentence.

Murder of Correction Officer Clutts 

On October 22, 1983, Silverstein killed Correction Officer Merle Clutts at USP Marion. After being let out of his cell for a shower, Silverstein used a ruse to get Clutts to walk ahead of him and positioned himself between Clutts and other officers. He stopped outside the cell of another inmate, Randy Gometz. Gometz passed a homemade prison knife to Silverstein and unlocked Silverstein's handcuffs with a homemade key. Silverstein then attacked Clutts, stabbing him multiple times. Silverstein later claimed that he murdered Clutts in retaliation for Clutts' deliberately harassing him. Among other things, Clutts was accused of destroying paintings by Silverstein. BOP (Bureau Of Prisons) confiscates art work when it depicts murder.

A few hours later, Clayton Fountain (also an Aryan Brotherhood member) used the same strategy to kill Correctional Officer Robert Hoffmann.

USP Marion was subsequently placed on an indefinite lockdown, which ultimately lasted for 23 years. Following the murder of Clutts, Silverstein was transferred to the United States Penitentiary, Atlanta, where he was placed in solitary confinement. His security status was recorded as "no human contact". The events surrounding the murders of Correctional Officers Clutts and Hoffmann inspired the design of the federal supermax prison, the United States Penitentiary, Florence: Administrative Maximum Facility (USP Florence ADMAX) in Colorado, which opened in 1994 and was built to house the most dangerous inmates in the federal prison system. Silverstein and Gometz were both held at ADX Florence. Fountain died in 2004 at the United States Medical Center for Federal Prisoners in Springfield, Missouri.

Riot in Atlanta and transfer to Leavenworth 
During the 1987 Atlanta Prison Riots, Cuban detainees at the Atlanta federal penitentiary released Silverstein from his isolation cell. They handed Silverstein over to the Federal Bureau of Investigation's Hostage Rescue Team one week later. Bureau of Prisons officials were reportedly afraid that Silverstein would begin killing correctional officers held hostage by the Cubans. Before the Cubans released Silverstein to Bureau of Prisons, the Cubans let Silverstein out of his isolation cell and Silverstein was able to roam freely about the prison. One of the prison guards being held hostage had a history of being kind to Silverstein. (When the guard would handcuff Silverstein he would make it a point to ask Silverstein if his handcuffs were too tight.) He was confronted by Silverstein and was ultimately spared by him. Bureau of Prisons negotiators were able to convince the Cuban riot leaders to hand over Silverstein as a gesture of good faith, a relatively easy decision for them, given that Silverstein's status was peripheral to the aims of the Cuban leaders during the riot.

Silverstein was subsequently moved back to Leavenworth, where he stayed for the next 18 years.

In 2005, when USP Leavenworth was downgraded to a medium-security facility, Silverstein was moved to ADX Florence, a supermax facility in Colorado. His earliest theoretical date of release was November 2, 2095.

Allegations of torture and injustice 
Silverstein claimed that the "no human contact" status is essentially a form of torture reserved for those who kill correctional officers. "When an inmate kills a guard, he must be punished", a Bureau of Prisons official told author Pete Earley. "We can't execute Silverstein, so we have no choice but to make his life a living hell. Otherwise other inmates will kill guards too. There has to be some supreme punishment. Every convict knows what Silverstein is going through. We want them to realize that if they cross the same line that he did, they will pay a heavy price." Ted Sellers, a former convict who met Silverstein during 25 years spent in prison, said he became a "legend" at Leavenworth. Sellers told BBC News Online, "He is not as bad as they portray. Sure he is dangerous if they push him to the wall. But there were some dirty rotten guards at Marion… They would purposely screw you around. You are dealing with a person locked up 23 hours a day. Of course he's got a short fuse."

Death 
Silverstein died on May 11, 2019, aged 67, at St. Anthony Hospital in Lakewood, Colorado, after spending 36 years in solitary confinement; he died due to complications from heart surgery.

References 

1952 births
2019 deaths
20th-century American criminals
American neo-Nazis
American people convicted of murder
American people convicted of robbery
American prisoners sentenced to life imprisonment
American serial killers
Aryan Brotherhood
Inmates of ADX Florence
Male serial killers
People from Long Beach, California
Serial killers who died in prison custody
People convicted of murder by the United States federal government
Prisoners sentenced to life imprisonment by the United States federal government
Prisoners who died in United States federal government detention